The discography of Martin Solveig, a French DJ and record producer, consists of four studio albums, one compilation album and twenty-six singles (including one as a featured artist).

His debut studio album, Sur la terre, was released in June 2002. The album includes the singles "Madan", "Rocking Music" and "I'm a Good Man".

His second studio album, Hedonist, was released in September 2005, the album peaked at number 43 on the French Albums Chart. The album includes the singles "Everybody", "Jealousy", "Something Better" and "Rejection".

His third studio album, C'est la Vie, was released in October 2008, the album peaked at number 16 on the French Albums Chart.  "C'est la Vie" was released as the lead single from the album on 21 January 2008. "I Want You" was released as the second single from the album on 15 September 2008. "One 2.3 Four" was released as the third single from the album on 22 December 2008. "Boys & Girls" was released as the fourth single from the album on 28 September 2009.

His fourth studio album, Smash, was released in June 2011, peaking at number 18 on the French Albums Chart. On 6 September 2010 he released the single "Hello" with Dragonette as the lead single from the album. It is Solveig's most successful single to date, peaking at number one in Austria, Belgium (Flanders), Czech Republic and the Netherlands, while charting within the top 10 in ten other countries. The song also peaked at number 13 on the UK Singles Chart. "Ready 2 Go" was released as the second single from the album on 28 March 2011. On 24 October 2011 "Big in Japan" was released as the third single from the album. On 2 April 2012 "The Night Out" was released as the fourth single from the album.

Albums

Studio albums

Compilation albums

Singles

As lead artist

As featured artist

References

External links
 

Discographies of French artists